Elaeagnus  tonkinensis is a species of plant in the oleaster family found around Southern China and Vietnam (where it is called Nhót).

References

External links
 
 

tonkinensis
Flora of Vietnam